Agrahara Bachahalli  is a village in the southern state of Karnataka, India. It is located in the Krishnarajpet taluk of Mandya district in Karnataka.

Agrahara Bachahalli is one of the most prosperous towns from the Hoysala period. The hero stones at Agrahara Bachahalli, numbering around 11, are at least 800 years old. A unique monument found here is the Garuda Lenka Kambhas (pillars), also known as the hero stones. As per inscriptions on these pillars, the family or individuals in whose name the stones are installed served the Hoysala rulers from the times of King Ereyanga (1098-1102). There are also many inscriptions from the time of King Veera Ballala II (1173-1220). The place has the best collection of hero stones and a rare veeragudi (a shrine for a hero).

It is home to numerous temples built during the Hoysala period. The "Huniseshwara Temple" is the most prominent and well maintained temple in the village. Agrahara Bachahalli famous for Sri lakshmi devi temple also known as Bachalamma, other temples includes Channakeshava temple, Bhairava temple etc.

See also
 Mandya
 Districts of Karnataka

References

External links
 http://Mandya.nic.in/

Villages in Mandya district